Bruce Baldwin may refer to:

 Bruce Baldwin (American football)
 Bruce Baldwin (cricket)